St Magnus's Church is a ruined medieval church located on the island of Egilsay, in Orkney, Scotland. The site is recognized as the place of execution of Saint Magnus Erlendsson, Earl of Orkney, in the 12th century. The roofless structure dates back to the 12th century, and has been described by Historic Environment Scotland (HES) as second only to St Magnus Cathedral, Kirkwall, as a surviving Norse church in Scotland.

Description
St Magnus's Church is located near the northwest coast of the island of Egilsay, in Orkney, Scotland. Egilsay belongs to the three island group of  Rousay, Egilsay and Wyre. These islands are also known as the Inner Northern Isles.

The church was built in the Romanesque style, with a rectangular nave, a chancel at the east end and a round tower at the west end. A door leads from the tower to the central nave of the church. The altar was located in the chancel, which opens directly to the nave. The chancel originally had an upper story. Both the nave and the chancel originally had steeply pitched, stone roofs that were taken down by 1847. Windows and doors have rounded arches. It tapers towards the top. The tower is similar to other round church towers found in northern Germany and countries bordering the North Sea, and Ireland. The site also consists of a graveyard surrounding the church.

The site is maintained by Historic Scotland as a scheduled ancient monument. Egilsay is accessible by ferry from Tingwall on the Orkney Mainland.
At present (January, 2022), the site is listed as "not open to visitors due to high level masonry inspections".

History
The Orkneyinga saga records that around 1116, Magnus Erlendsson, Earl of Orkney, travelled to the island to resolve a dispute with his rival, Earl Haakon. St Magnus spent the night on the island, possibly in a church, and the next day was captured by Haakon and executed. In 1136, Bishop William of Orkney, sanctified the murdered Earl, who became Saint Magnus, and it is thought that the present church was constructed shortly afterwards on the supposed site of the murder. There may have been an earlier church at or near the site before the murder of Magnus.  The existing structure is the last surviving of the round-towered churches of the Northern Isles.

References

12th-century church buildings in Scotland
Historic Scotland properties in Orkney
Scandinavian Scotland
Churches in Orkney
Scheduled Ancient Monuments in Orkney
Romanesque architecture in Scotland